Kokernot Field is a baseball stadium in Alpine, Texas, USA. The field has been called "The Best Little Ballpark in Texas (or Anywhere Else)" by Sports Illustrated and the "Yankee Stadium of Texas" by Texas Monthly magazine. An estimated 6,000 attended a 1951 exhibition featuring Satchel Paige's St. Louis Browns versus the Chicago White Sox. Future major leaguers Norm Cash and Gaylord Perry also played on Kokernot Field.

The stadium was constructed in 1947 by Big Bend rancher Herbert Lee Kokernot Jr. for his semi-professional baseball team. Red clay for the infield was hauled in by boxcar from Georgia. Native stone quarried from the Kokernot Ranch was used to construct the outfield wall and grandstand. The Kokernot Ranch "o6" brand was incorporated into numerous decorations throughout the stadium along with intricate ironwork of baseballs complete with painted threads.

The stadium was built to seat 1,400 people. Lighting was installed in 1958. Ownership of the field was turned over to the Alpine Independent School District in 1968 after Sul Ross State University discontinued their baseball program and semi-professional play ceased in Alpine after the 1961 season. Sul Ross' baseball program was revived in 1983, and a new independent league professional team was formed in 2009, so the field is currently home to the Sul Ross State University Lobos and the Alpine Cowboys of the Pecos League through lease arrangements.

The Big Bend Cowboys doubleheader on 17 May 2009 was the first professional baseball played at Kokernot Field in 48 years.

See also
Big Bend National Park
Davis Mountains
Sul Ross State University
Trans-Pecos

References

External links

Photos of West Texas

Minor league baseball venues
Buildings and structures in Brewster County, Texas
Baseball venues in Texas
NAIA World Series venues